George Barlow (born 7 February 1933 in Stoke,  UK) is a retired Australian footballer.

Club career
George Barlow spent his adult career (1952-1959) playing for Balgownie Rangers FC. This included the period of 1957-1959 during which he captained the side. Barlow led the side to victory in the 1957 Sydney Cup (State League Div 1 championships). He represented NSW (against Blackpool in their 1958 tour) and was selected for the national side once. Barlow began his career as a junior with Port Vale FC.

Barlow initially played as an inside right but transitioned into a centre half later in his career. He retired in 1959 after an ankle injury.

Honours

Club
 Balgownie Rangers FC
 NSW State League Div 1: 1952-1959

Individual

References

 South Coast Times & Wollongong Argus article from April 16, 1953
  Sydney Morning Herald entry from April 23, 1953
 South Coast Times & Wollongong Argus article from April 23, 1954
  Sydney Morning Herald entry from May 16, 1954
 Illawarra Mercury Article from May 17, 1954
 Sun Herald article from May 23, 1954
 South Coast Times & Wollongong Argus article from May 24, 1954
 Illawarra Mercury article from August 26, 1954

External links
  Historic Balgownie Rangers FC photos including of the 1957 squad that won the Sydney Cup with Barlow holding the cup

1933 births
Living people
Sportspeople from Wollongong
Association football fullbacks
Australian soccer players
Australia international soccer players